Breakdown is a 2016 British thriller film written and directed by Jonnie Malachi, produced by Luke Fairbrass, and starring Craig Fairbrass, James Cosmo and Bruce Payne.

Plot
A professional contract killer, haunted by visions of his violent past, spirals out of control. His work compromised as he reaches breaking point, he is forced to defend his family from his ruthless employers.

Cast

 Craig Fairbrass as Alfie Jennings
 James Cosmo as Albert Chapman
 Emmett Scanlan as Connor Moran
 Mem Ferda as Hakan Abaci
 Tamer Hassan as Iraz Kartal
 Bruce Payne as Peter Grainger
 Olivia Grant as Catherine Jennings
 Rab Affleck as Ronnie Anderson
 David Bark-Jones as Benedict Morgan-Wells
 Nick Cornwall as Philip Boden
 Brian Nickels as Moses
 Amanda Wass as Maya Jennings
 Richard Cunningham as Percy Johnson
 Rodrig Andrisan as Josef
 Bethan Wright as Sinead

Production
The film was shot on location in London and Essex. This film was partly financed by Red Rock Entertainment.

Reception

The film has received mixed reviews.  Jeremy Aspinall of the Radio Times stated that 'it's not the most original of premises, but Fairbrass proves a rugged presence and Cosmo is a terrifying villain'. Emma Thrower of Empire stated that 'Breakdown spirals into a pool of clichés and never manages to drag itself out'. Tony Peters stated that Craig Fairbrass gave 'a fine performance' as 'an ageing hitman who himself becomes a target' which 'lifts this thriller above the norm'. In Andy Jones' view 'British director Jonnie Malachi’s gangster pastiche Breakdown is a vicious mongrel of a movie, frothing and snarling but with a fatal lack of bite in its bark'.

References

External links
 
 
 

2016 films
2016 action thriller films
British action thriller films
Films set in London
Films shot in England
Films shot in London
2010s English-language films
2010s British films